Bolaman is a town in Fatsa district of Ordu Province, Turkey. At  it is a coastal town on Turkish state highway  which runs along the Black Sea coast. The population of the Bolaman is 5583 as of 2011. The town (as well as the creek of the town) is named after Polemon, a governor of Ordu and vicinity during  the Roman Empire era. But the town itself was founded in the 19th century. In 1966 it was declared a seat of township. A small Byzantine fortification with an attached chapel was converted into an Ottoman-period residence.

References

Populated places in Ordu Province
Towns in Turkey
Fatsa District
Populated coastal places in Turkey